Brady Township is a township in Huntingdon County, Pennsylvania, United States. The population was 1,172 at the 2010 census. The township includes the villages of Fousetown and Airydale. Brady Township was named for Hugh Brady, a brigadier general in the United States Army who was born in Huntingdon, Pennsylvania. Township had been separated from Henderson in 1846.

Geography

Demographics

As of the census of 2000, there were 1,035 people, 376 households, and 291 families residing in the township.  The population density was 32.9 people per square mile (12.7/km2).  There were 440 housing units at an average density of 14.0/sq mi (5.4/km2).  The racial makeup of the township was 98.74% White, 0.10% African American, 0.10% Native American, 0.10% from other races, and 0.97% from two or more races. Hispanic or Latino of any race were 0.68% of the population.

There were 376 households, out of which 35.4% had children under the age of 18 living with them, 69.4% were married couples living together, 4.0% had a female householder with no husband present, and 22.6% were non-families. 20.5% of all households were made up of individuals, and 12.5% had someone living alone who was 65 years of age or older.  The average household size was 2.75 and the average family size was 3.17.

In the township the population was spread out, with 28.3% under the age of 18, 9.4% from 18 to 24, 25.1% from 25 to 44, 26.6% from 45 to 64, and 10.6% who were 65 years of age or older.  The median age was 35 years. For every 100 females there were 99.0 males.  For every 100 females age 18 and over, there were 94.8 males.

The median income for a household in the township was $28,750, and the median income for a family was $33,438. Males had a median income of $29,231 versus $26,250 for females. The per capita income for the township was $13,292.  About 14.8% of families and 17.1% of the population were below the poverty line, including 22.7% of those under age 18 and 16.2% of those age 65 or over.

References

External links
Brady Township Information
History of Brady Township

Townships in Huntingdon County, Pennsylvania
Townships in Pennsylvania